William Witman II (January 31, 1914 – March 12, 1978) was an American diplomat. He graduated from Yale University in 1935 and joined the United States Foreign Service the same year. He was appointed as United States Ambassador to Togo from 1964 to 1967. He retired from the foreign service in 1974. He married Melpomene "Melpo" Sasalios and died in 1978. His wife died in 2006.

References

1914 births
1978 deaths
People from Dauphin County, Pennsylvania
Ambassadors of the United States to Togo
United States Foreign Service personnel
Yale University alumni